The Luisón (Luisõ in Guaraní) is one of the seven legendary beasts of Paraguay, and is the seventh and last son of Tau and Kerana. The myth says that in a family with seven male children, the last child will become Luison.

Myth
In the original version of the myth, Luisón was the seventh and last child of Tau and Kerana, and thus was the most accursed. He appeared to be a giant dog, and was said to be extremely ugly, even horrendous looking.

The myth tells that the seventh son in a family will become Luisón when he reaches adolescence.

See also
"Cry Luison"

External links
 E-Learning Queen: Folklore and the Horrors of War: "El Luison"
 https://www.smithsonianmag.com/smart-news/argentina-has-superstition-7th-sons-will-turn-werewolves-180953746/
 Argentina, a Primary Source Cultural Guide

Guaraní legendary creatures
Mythological dogs
Werewolves